Glenbrook is a rural and industrial area in the Auckland region of New Zealand. The industrial area, that of New Zealand's major steel mill, New Zealand Steel, is not located close to any towns - the surrounding countryside is occupied by farms.  The nearest towns are Waiuku, five kilometres to the south, and Pukekohe, 15 kilometres to the east.

Glenbrook's other claim to fame is the Glenbrook Vintage Railway.

History

Construction of the Glenbrook Steel Mill began in 1967. Glenbrook was chosen as the site due to the area's proximity to the Waikato North Head ironsand mine and the Huntly Power Station.

Demographics

Glenbrook had a population of 2,193 at the 2018 New Zealand census, an increase of 159 people (7.8%) since the 2013 census, and an increase of 219 people (11.1%) since the 2006 census. There were 741 households, comprising 1,110 males and 1,083 females, giving a sex ratio of 1.02 males per female. The median age was 44.4 years (compared with 37.4 years nationally), with 402 people (18.3%) aged under 15 years, 336 (15.3%) aged 15 to 29, 1,134 (51.7%) aged 30 to 64, and 324 (14.8%) aged 65 or older.

Ethnicities were 86.0% European/Pākehā, 10.8% Māori, 4.1% Pacific peoples, 8.5% Asian, and 1.8% other ethnicities. People may identify with more than one ethnicity.

The percentage of people born overseas was 19.7, compared with 27.1% nationally.

Although some people chose not to answer the census's question about religious affiliation, 59.0% had no religion, 28.2% were Christian, 0.7% had Māori religious beliefs, 0.5% were Hindu, 0.7% were Muslim, 0.5% were Buddhist and 1.9% had other religions.

Of those at least 15 years old, 285 (15.9%) people had a bachelor's or higher degree, and 303 (16.9%) people had no formal qualifications. The median income was $38,600, compared with $31,800 nationally. 420 people (23.5%) earned over $70,000 compared to 17.2% nationally. The employment status of those at least 15 was that 1,020 (57.0%) people were employed full-time, 261 (14.6%) were part-time, and 54 (3.0%) were unemployed.

Education

References

External links 
Glenbrook Vintage Railway

Geography of the Auckland Region
Populated places in the Auckland Region
Populated places around the Manukau Harbour